Muger Cement (Amharic: ሙገር ሲሚንቶ) is a professional Ethiopian football club based in Wonji. They are a member of the Ethiopian Football Federation national league.

History 
Muger Cement played in the Ethiopian Premier League until they were relegated after the 2014-15 season.

Stadium 
Their home stadium is Wonji Stadium.

Active departments 

 Volleyball team

Honors

Domestic 
Ethiopian Cup: 1
1994

Former players 

  Abel Mamo

See also
 Durba

References

Football clubs in Ethiopia
1986 establishments in Ethiopia
Association football clubs established in 1986
Sport in Oromia Region